Nicole Fortuin (born 30 April 1992) is a South African actress, dancer, and theatre maker. Her films include Flatland (2019), Indemnity (2021), and Late Bloomer (2022). On television, she is known for her roles in Roer Jou Voete (2015–2016) and Alles Malan (2019–2022).

Early life and education
Fortuin is from Belhar, Cape Town. She attended the Settlers High School. At 16 in 2008, she became a top 4 finalist in e.tv's Shield Teens No Sweat Dance Challenge. She graduated with a Bachelor of Arts in Theatre and Performance from the University of Cape Town in 2014.

Career
After graduating from UCT, Fortuin was cast as Maryke van Niekerk in the Afrikaans-language SABC 3 series Roer Jou Voete. The following year, she made her feature film debut in the American teen film A Cinderella Story: If the Shoe Fits as Georgie, a makeup artist and Fairy Godmother-figure to Sofia Carson's character. In 2017, Fortuin appeared in the films Van der Merwe, a comedy and Vaselinetjie, a drama, as well as the second season of Swartwater as Cindy. She starred in Jenna Bass' critically acclaimed 2019 film Flatland. That same year, she began starring as Lee-Ann in the kykNET series Alles Malan. Fortuin appeared in season 2 of Blood & Water on Netflix as well as the action film Indemnity and the Showmax film Late Bloomer. She has an upcoming role in Kelsey Egan's The Fix.

Filmography

Film

Television

Stage

References

External links
 
Nicole Fortuin at TVSA

Living people
1992 births
21st-century South African actresses
Actresses from Cape Town
Cape Coloureds